Damned Women is a sculpture created by Auguste Rodin between 1885 and 1890 as part of his The Gates of Hell project—it appears on the upper right as the counterpart to The Fallen Caryatid.

Description
It shows two embracing women, a theme also explored by the same artist in Youth Triumphant, Ovid's Metamorphoses and Illusions Received by the Earth. 

According to Elsen:

Work
As in Metamorphoses, Rodin modelled the work on ballerinas from the Paris Opera, as recommended by Edgar Degas. The work also draws on Les Fleurs du mal by Charles Baudelaire, particularly Lesbos and two poems entitled Femmes damnées. According to Miranda:

See also
List of sculptures by Auguste Rodin

References

External links

Lesbianism
Sculptures of the Museo Soumaya
1880s sculptures
Sculptures by Auguste Rodin
Bronze sculptures in Mexico